Elizabeth Deans Paterson  (1894 – 5 July 1970) was an Australian commercial artist, cartoonist and illustrator. She was best known for her pictures of babies and young children.

Life 
Elizabeth Deans Paterson was born in Carlton, Victoria in 1894, daughter of Elizabeth Leslie (née Deans) and artist Hugh Paterson. Her older sister Esther Paterson (1892–1971) was also a commercial artist, illustrator and cartoonist. Their uncle was Scottish-born landscape painter John Ford Paterson.

Paterson sent her first drawing to The Bulletin in response to a bet by cartoonist David Low. Her drawing was published, she won the bet and began her career contributing illustrations to magazines.

At the time of her first marriage in 1923 to Kenneth Fossie Newman, Paterson had already made a name for herself for her drawings and portraits of children. She was divorced by her husband in 1931 and given custody of their daughter, Barbara, who later became an artist.

By the mid-1920s she and her sister Esther had established themselves as commercial artists who were "the cleverest designers in Australia" of posters, illustrated books, calendars and Christmas cards. In 1922 they held a joint exhibition in Queen's Hall, Melbourne which was opened by Prime Minister Billy Hughes. Her drawings of young children were noted for their "fetching impertinence". Her 1931 solo exhibition was opened by the Melbourne lord mayor, Harold Gengoult Smith, while in 1935 the lady mayoress, Mrs A. G. Wales, did the honours. 

Her work was published in many magazines, including The Australian Home Beautiful, The Australian Woman's Mirror, The New Triad, and The Bulletin. In the 1935 The Australian Woman's Mirror awarded an original drawing by Paterson each week to the person who made the best original contribution to the magazine.

Portraits of Paterson by her sister Esther were finalists for the Archibald Prize in 1938 and 1939.

Paterson was made a Member of the Order of the British Empire in 1966 for her service to art and the community.

In 1952 she married Albion Wiltshire. Paterson died on 5 July 1970 at Middle Park in Victoria.

References

External links 

 Miss Betty Paterson/The yellow gloves, 1938 portrait by Esther Paterson, held in the New England Regional Art Museum

1894 births
1970 deaths
Australian cartoonists
20th-century Australian women artists
Artists from Melbourne
People from Carlton, Victoria
Australian people of Scottish descent
National Gallery of Victoria Art School alumni